Marie Rosalie Joséphine Texier-Lahoulle (22 July 1889 – 10 September 1972) was a French politician. She was elected to the National Assembly in October 1945 as one of the first group of French women in parliament, and served in the National Assembly until November the following year.

Biography
Marie Lahoulle was born in Auray in 1901. She married Ernest Texier, a notary and brother of army general . The couple had two children, both of whom died for France.

Texier-Lahoulle was an MRP candidate in Morbihan department in the October 1945 National Assembly elections, and was elected to parliament, becoming one of the first group of women in the National Assembly. A member of the Civil and Military Pensions Commission, she was re-elected in the June 1946 elections, but lost her seat in the November 1946 election.

In 1950 Texier-Lahoulle joined the Rally of the French People (RPF) due to her support for Charles de Gaulle. She resigned from the party in 1953 in an effort to create a joint MRP–RPF list for the municipal elections that year. She died in Vannes in 1972.

References

1889 births
Popular Republican Movement politicians
Women members of the National Assembly (France)
1972 deaths
20th-century French women politicians